XLN (also known as XLN Business Services) is a provider of utility services to small businesses in the UK. As of 2015, its core products are telecoms (including business broadband and phone line), business mobile, card processing machines, fibre broadband, free public Wi-Fi, VoIP hosting and business energy.
XLN focuses on small and medium-sized enterprises and start-ups, and claims to have served over 700,000 customers across the UK in a wide variety of sectors and industries.

History
XLN began in 2002 when founder, Christian Nellemann, identified a gap in the market for a telecoms provider that focuses on small businesses. Nellemann started selling business telecoms door-to-door, and after building up a customer base expanded the product range to include card processing, energy, and fibre broadband.

In 2008, Nellemann led a management buyout of XLN with Palatine Private Equity and again in 2010 when ECI Partners acquired a majority stake in the company.

Services
Business broadband
XLN provides business broadband to small businesses in three key packages: Unlimited Broadband, Unlimited Fibre and Unlimited Fibre XL. Each package offers different features, from unlimited broadband with a free router to 75Mbit/s Fibre with free public Wi-Fi, unlimited phone calls and free online security. Broadband can be purchased with a business phone line, or by itself.
XLN uses the BT Openreach and TalkTalk Business networks to provide its business broadband and telephone services.

Business phone
Like its business broadband products, XLN offers business phone lines in its Basix, Xtra and Max packages. The basic package provides line rental and free online account management and support, while the Max package includes extras like mobile minutes and unlimited UK landline calls. Businesses can choose which package best suits their requirements.

Business Fibre
One of XLN's latest products is Business Fibre, which uses the growing fibre broadband network to deliver high-speed internet to businesses around the country. Whereas its standard broadband offers speeds of up to 17Mb, XLN Business Fibre quotes speeds of up to 76Mb.

Card processing machines
As well as broadband and business phone lines, XLN also offers card processing machines, including countertop, portable, and mobile card machines to merchants.

Free Public Wi-Fi
In 2016, XLN began offering free public Wi-Fi hotspot to any business customer with a fibre broadband connection. As of 2017, it was the biggest free public Wi-Fi network in the UK.

XLN Mobile
In 2018, XLN started offering free mobile SIMs, with unlimited minutes and texts, to all of its existing customers.

Business energy
XLN provides business gas and electricity

Location
XLN is based in the UK, with its head office at Millbank Tower in London. In 2014, the company expanded to open a second office at One North Bank Sheffield. All of its call centres are run from these locations.

Awards and recognition

XLN has won a number of awards, including:
 Best in Sector: SME Telecommunications Acquisition International Awards 2015, a vanity award
 Best Customer Focus at the 2013 Best Business Awards

References

Companies based in the City of London
Internet service providers of the United Kingdom
Telecommunications companies of the United Kingdom
2014 establishments in the United Kingdom